Government J. Buana College is a college in the town of Lunglei, Mizoram. It is accredited with a B Grade by the National Assessment and Accreditation Council. It has 582 students and 40 faculty members.

History
Government J. Buana College was established on 26 August, 1983. The college is named after J. Buana who was a Padma Shree awardee. He donated rupees two lakhs for its establishment and management. The college caters to the needs of the locality and the poorer section for higher education. The college was provincialized in 1976 by the Government of Mizoram. It is permanently affiliated to Mizoram University Vide Order No. MZU/CDC/32/2002 of 27 July 2006 and is 2f and 12b category under University Grants Commission (India).

Location

Government J. Buana College is located in Lunglei which has a population of 77,482. Its present campus is 0.4 acres (1,309.6 sq m) in area and is located in the Bazarveng area of Lunglei. However, a new site with an area of 14,412.22 sq m has been acquired at Melte, Serkawn, Lunglei. Development of the new campus is currently at the planning and design phase.

Courses

Bachelor of Arts
The college offers nine undergraduate courses in Arts: Economics, Education, English, History, Mizo, Geography, Political Science and Public Administration.

Bachelor of Commerce
Since 2019, the college also offers a Bachelor of Commerce degree course.

Add-On Courses

CCC
In collaboration with National Institute of Electronics & Information Technology (NIELIT), Government J. Buana College offers a Course on Computer Concepts (CCC). The college is equipped with a computer laboratory. The course is offered free of charge to all students of the college. The duration of the course is 80 hours (Theory: 32 hours & Practical Classes: 48 hours).

Spoken Language Classes
Free spoken language classes in English and Hindi are offered to all students of the college.

NAAC Accreditation
Government J. Buana College had its first and second National Assessment and Accreditation Council (NAAC) assessment in 2007 and 2015. The third cycle of NAAC assessment in 2021 gave a B grade with a CGPA of 2.27.

Faculty
There are 40 teachers. There are: One Professor (the principal), 14 Associate Professors, and 26 Assistant Professors. There are also eight non-teaching staff.

Students
There are 582 students currently enrolled in the undergraduate courses. Admission is done via both online and offline modes. Selection is based on merit in the last board examination. More than 97% belong to minority and Scheduled Tribe categories. The gender ratio of males to females is 0.94:1.

Clubs & Cells
Students can enroll in the various clubs and cells of the college:
 Culture & Fine Arts Club
 Ek Bharat Shreshtha Bharat (EBSB) Club
 Eco Club
 Evangelical Union
 History Club
 Literary Club
 National Service Scheme (NSS)
 Red Ribbon Club
 Sports & Fitness Club
 Students' Union
 Youth Adventure Club
 YUVA Tourism Club

Activities
Government J. Buana College organises a number of activities throughout the academic session. Orientation sessions for freshers are usually held on the first week of the students joining the college. A Freshers' Social is organised by the Students' Union to welcome the new students. The annual College Week, primarily held during the odd semester, is a week-long series of events where competitions are organised in different activities and sports. A Valedictory Day is also organised for the outgoing students of the college at the end of the academic year.

A number of activities are also organised by the different clubs, cells and committees of the college. Mass blood donation programmes are organised by the NSS usually in association with the Mizoram State AIDS Control Society (MSACS) and the Association for Voluntary Blood Donation (AVBD). The NSS also actively participate in community works and social services. It has adopted Mausen as its adopted village with the aim of promoting the social and educational development of the village. Field trips are organised on a regular basis to places that have historical, cultural and educational significances. The Youth Adventure Club of the college holds adventure camps for its members every year. The Career Counselling & Placement Cell and Capacity Building and Skill Enhancement Committee organise a number of workshops and programmes for the students.

See also
Education in India
Education in Mizoram
Mizoram University

References

External links
 

Colleges affiliated to Mizoram University
Universities and colleges in Mizoram
Lunglei